Rugg Peak is a peak at the east side of Widmark Ice Piedmont southward of Crookes Peak, on the west coast of Graham Land. Photographed by Hunting Aerosurveys Ltd. in 1956–57, and mapped from these photos by the Falkland Islands Dependencies Survey (FIDS). Named by the United Kingdom Antarctic Place-Names Committee (UK-APC) in 1959 for Andrew Rugg-Gunn, English ophthalmic surgeon, who in 1934 brought together the relevant data on radiation and protective glasses to improve the design of snow goggles.
 

Mountains of Graham Land
Loubet Coast